Jim Van De Laer (born 11 April 1968 in Aarschot) is a former Belgian cyclist.

Major results
1993
1st Stage 3 Vuelta a los Valles Mineros
1995
1st Overall Niederösterreich Rundfahrt

Grand Tour Results

Source:

Tour de France
1992: 30th
1993: DNF
1994: 24th
1995: 76th

Giro d'Italia
1995: DNF

Vuelta a España
1991: 32nd

References

1968 births
Living people
Belgian male cyclists
People from Aarschot
Cyclists from Flemish Brabant